Flavio Costantini (21 September 1926 – 20 May 2013) was an Italian artist. Costantini created portraits of writers and artists for newspapers, and illustrated several novels. His early works were inspired by the novelist Franz Kafka, and by literary, utopian and anarchist ideals. His later work presented a pessimistic view of civilization. He created series of paintings exploring historical themes: Anarchy, the wreck of the Titanic, alchemy and Mozart, the French Revolution and its victims, Yekaterinburg and the murder of Nicholas II and his family.   His last series offered a dark reading of Pinocchio, which he considered one of the three or four greatest Italian novels.

Biography

Early life
In September 1926 he was born in Rome to middle-class parents, and his father was an amateur painter. As a child, he was crafty, and kept a diary accompanied with newspaper cut-outs, collages, photos and drawings. At a renowned Roman high school, he failed French and Latin.

World War II
Costantini's experiences during World War II led his focus to the suffering and meaninglessness of the world; it was at this time, too, that he became interested in utopianism. He graduated as sea captain, served in the Italian Navy, and 1951 to 1954 was employed in the Merchant Marine. He moved with his family to Rapallo and in 1959, after a visit to Spain, devoted a series of paintings to bullfighting. He was a member of the artists' group that founded the Galleria del Deposito in Boccadasse, Genoa. Other members were Eugenio Carmi, Emanuele Luzzati, Carlo Vita, etc. A collector of old illustrated magazines, he used this material to create in his Rapallo home and studio paintings and portraits, which typically include period pieces and advertisements. He often depicted scenes in Genoa (squares, shops, buildings, boats), contrasting the old and the new. Philip Levine's poem "On a Drawing by Flavio", describes Costantini's stark portrait of the Rabbi of Auschwitz, who "bows his head and prays / for us all". Costantini died in Genoa after a short illness. A memorial meeting, with talks by friends and critics, was held on 12 June 2013 at the Museo Luzzati, Genoa, which holds a number of his works.

Inspiration
He first experimented with illustration after his time spent in the Italian navy doing drawings of Kafka's work. "His earliest ventures into art were motivated more by intellectual frustration than by artistic masters. 'I started to draw because I read the Kafka books… it was impossible to write like Kafka, so I began to draw'. Other writers followed, but it was the human condition as portrayed by Kafka that was to remain the dominant influence in Costantini’s world." But it wasn't until the 1960s when he read Victor Serge's Memoires of a Revolutionary that he began to champion anarchism through his works.

Novels illustrated
The Pony by Vladimir Mayakovsky (1969, reprint 2006)
Heart by Edmondo De Amicis (1977) 
The Shadow Line by Joseph Conrad (1989)
Notes from Underground by Fyodor Dostoyevsky (1997)

See also
 Anarchist art

References

External links
 Gallery at the Kate Sharpley Library
 Christy Books: Anarchist Publisher 
 

1926 births
2013 deaths
20th-century Italian painters
Italian male painters
21st-century Italian painters
Italian illustrators
Italian anarchists